The 2003–04 NBA season was the 34th season for the Portland Trail Blazers in the National Basketball Association. After years of off the court troubles and playoff underachieving, the Blazers under new General Manager John Nash, decided to rebuild. Throughout the season, the Blazers dealt away talented but troubled stars like trading Bonzi Wells, after losing his co-captain title, to the Memphis Grizzlies in November, and trading Rasheed Wallace to the Atlanta Hawks for Shareef Abdur-Rahim and Theo Ratliff in February. However, after appearing in only one game with the Hawks, Sheed was again traded to the Detroit Pistons for the rest of the season. The Pistons would eventually win the NBA Finals of that year, giving Wallace his first championship. The team also sent Jeff McInnis to the Cleveland Cavaliers for Darius Miles.

Taking up the slack was Zach Randolph, who led the team in scoring and rebounding, and was named Most Improved Player of The Year. However, the Blazers finished third in the Pacific Division with a 41–41 record, missing the playoffs for the first time since the 1981–82 season, a 21-year streak that was second-longest in NBA history. Following the season, Dale Davis was traded to the Golden State Warriors.

For this season, they slightly once again changed their primary logo they remained only lasted just one season.

Draft picks

Roster

Regular season

Season standings

z - clinched division title
y - clinched division title
x - clinched playoff spot

Record vs. opponents

Game log

Player statistics

Awards and honors
 Zach Randolph, NBA Most Improved Player
 Theo Ratliff, NBA All-Defensive Second Team

Transactions

References

Portland Trail Blazers seasons
Portland Trail Blazers 2003
Port
Port
Port
Portland Trail Blazers